The 2015 Pan American Track Cycling Championships took place at the Peñalolén Velodrome, Santiago, Chile,  September 2–6, 2015.

Medal summary

Men

Women

Medal table

References

Americas
Cycling
Pan American Road and Track Championships
International cycle races hosted by Chile